Calvin Davis (born April 2, 1972 in Eutaw, Alabama) is a former American athlete who competed mainly in the 400 meters, though his fame comes from his success in the 400 meter hurdles.

Davis ran for the United States at the 1996 Summer Olympics in Atlanta, United States where he won the bronze medal in the men's 400 meter hurdles event.

Davis competed collegiately for the University of Arkansas, primarily as a flat 400 meter sprinter, not learning the hurdles until later.  He won the NCAA Indoor 400 meter title in 1993 and 1994.  In 2013 he was inducted into the University of Arkansas Athletic Hall of Honor.

Rankings

Davis stayed among the best 400 meter hurdlers in the US for a number of years, as evidenced by his rankings from Track and Field News

References
 Calvin Davis profile at USATF.org

1972 births
Living people
People from Eutaw, Alabama
American male hurdlers
Athletes (track and field) at the 1996 Summer Olympics
Olympic bronze medalists for the United States in track and field
University of Arkansas people
Arkansas Razorbacks men's track and field athletes
Medalists at the 1996 Summer Olympics
World Athletics Indoor Championships winners